A Muralha is a Brazilian historical fiction television series that first aired on Rede Globo in 2000.

Synopsis

A hundred years after Europeans set foot in the New World, Brazil still remains largely unexplored. The Conquest recounts the saga of the earliest adventurers who wandered through these unknown lands. Jesuit priests, adventurers seeking gold, slaves and indigenous tribes were entangled in unceasing battles, at a time when laws were made by the sharp edge of a sword.

Cast

References

External links
 

2000 Brazilian television series debuts
2000 Brazilian television series endings
Fiction set in the 17th century
Period television series
Television shows based on Brazilian novels